This is an episode list for The Avengers: Earth's Mightiest Heroes. The series is based on the Marvel Comics superhero team, the Avengers. A 20 part micro-series focusing on each hero's backstory debuted on September 22, 2010 on Disney XD. The first season premiered on Disney XD in the United States on October 20, 2010. The second season premiered on April 1, 2012.

Series overview 
{| class="wikitable plainrowheaders" style="text-align:center;"
|-
! colspan="2" rowspan="2" |Season
! rowspan="2" |Episodes
! colspan="2" |Originally aired
|-
! First aired
! Last aired
|-
| style="background:#b8860b;"| 
| Micro-series
| 20
| 
|  
|-
| style="background:#ff5f5c;"| 
| 1
| 26
| 
|  
|-
| style="background:#6f98d2;"| 
| 2
| 26
| 
| 
|}

Episodes

Micro-series (2010)
A micro-series, consisting of five-and-a-half-minute "micro-episodes" created from the footage from season-one episodes, premiered online and on Disney XD on September 22, 2010. Series supervising producer Josh Fine said the goal was to "let us explore the individual members of the team in their own ongoing adventures ... do a lot of character development and set the stage for the rest of the season". The last micro-episode aired online on October 11, 2010 and on Disney XD on October 15, 2010.

Season 1 (2010–11)
The first season premiered on October 20, 2010 with the two-part episode "Breakout", continuing on from the events of the online micro-series. This move meant that the series did not air on television in chronological story order; the broadcast of "Breakout" was followed by the episodes "Iron Man is Born", "Thor the Mighty", "Hulk Versus the World", "Meet Captain America", and "The Man in the Ant Hill", each one a compilation of four micro-series episodes, which all take place before "Breakout". The series took a hiatus after "The Kang Dynasty" and returned on May 15, 2011 in the United States.

The series was broadcast around the world and released on DVD in the correct chronological story order (production order). The season finale debuted in Australia on April 12, 2011, then aired on June 26, 2011 in the United States. The first half of Season 1 was released on home video on April 26, 2011, and the second half was released on October 25, 2011.

Season 2 (2012)
Marvel Animation and Disney XD later confirmed a second season of the series. The first episode was publicly shown at the 2011 San Diego Comic-Con in June 2011 and again at New York Comic-Con in October 2011 before its television broadcast.

References

Lists of Marvel Comics animated series episodes
Lists of American children's animated television series episodes
Avengers (comics) lists
Episodes